The petroleum industry in Aberdeen began with the discovery of significant oil deposits in the North Sea during the mid-20th century.  Aberdeen became the centre of Europe's petroleum industry. With the largest heliport in the world and an important service ship harbour port serving offshore oil rigs, Aberdeen is often called the "Oil Capital of Europe". The number of jobs created by the energy industry in and around Aberdeen has been estimated at half a million.

Today, reserves are still flowing fast, but it has been estimated that the North Sea is nearing or has even surpassed its peak production rate. As a result, Aberdeen is expected to have to redevelop itself as a research and development hub, rather than a base for offshore drilling, in order to remain home to the multi-national companies that drive its economy. There have been local political attempts to turn Aberdeen's reputation as the "Oil Capital of Europe" into the "Energy Capital of Europe".

As of 2013, despite declining North Sea reserves, Aberdeen remained a major world center for undersea petroleum technology.

The most severe disaster to occur in the region took place in 1988, when the city was dealt a heavy blow by the loss of 167 men during an explosion and fire aboard an offshore rig, the Piper Alpha. It remains the world's worst offshore disaster and there is a memorial to the crew in Hazlehead Park.

References

Economy of Aberdeen